Vietnam Chamber of Commerce and Industry (VCCI) is a national organization which assembles and represents business community, employers and business associations of all economic sectors in Vietnam. The promotion of trade and business relations with enterprises abroad is one of its main functions. VCCI is an independent, non-governmental, non-profit organization having the status of a legal entity and operating with financial autonomy.  N.B. The email links on their site do not work.

Standing Committee 

 Dr. Vu Tien Loc, President of VCCI, President of the Central Council of Vietnam Business Associations
 Dr. Doan Duy Khuong, Vice President of VCCI, Editor-in-Chief, VBF Magazine
 Mr. Vo Tan Thanh, Vice President of VCCI, General Director of VCCI Branch in Ho Chi Minh City
 Mr. Hoang Quang Phong, Vice President of VCCI, Vice Chairman of the Central Council of the Vietnam Business Associations
 Mr. Nguyen Quang Vinh, Member of the Standing Committee, General Secretary of VCCI, General Director Office for  Business  Sustainable Development, General Secretary of the Council of Business for Sustainable Development of Vietnam.
 Mr. Bui Trung Nghia, Deputy General Secretary of VCCI
 Ms Tran Thi Lan Anh, Deputy General Secretary of VCCI

References

External links 
 Dr. Vu Tien Loc, We Economic Forum
 Dr. Doan Duy Khuong: “Life is a continual process of adaptation and efforts”
 Mr. Nguyen Quang Vinh, Asia Sustainability Reporting Summit 2019
 Dr. Vu Tien Loc & Amazon.com: E-commerce Jobs Reviews in Vietnam 

Chambers of commerce
Economy of Vietnam
Non-profit organizations based in Vietnam
Organizations established in 2003
2003 establishments in Vietnam